Mekuti Sutthiwong (died 1581) or Mae Ku was king of Lan Na from 1551 to 1564. His reign saw the transition of Lan Na into a vassal state under the Burmese-led Toungoo empire, following Bayinnaung's capture of Chiang Mai. In Burmese folk religion, Mekuti is venerated as Yun Bayin, one of 37 nats in the official pantheon of Burmese nats.

Names 
Across historical sources, Mekuti is known by various names, including: Maeku (พระเป็นเจ้าแม่กุ) in the Chiang Mai Chronicle, Mekuti (พระเมกุฏิสุทธิวงศ์) in the Yonok Chronicle, Phaya Maeku (พญาเมกุ), Chao Khanan Maeku (เจ้าขนานแม่กุ), as well as Yun Bayin (ယွန်းဘုရင်) and Bya Than (ဗြသံ) in Burmese language sources.

Early life 
Mekuti was a direct descendant of King Mangrai, descending from Mangrai's son, Khun Khrua, who ruled Mong Nai (in modern-day Shan State of Myanmar) from 1312 onward.

Reign 
Mekuti reigned from 1551 to 1558 as King of Lan Na. Following the defeat of Lan Na during the Burmese-Siam War of 1563, Lan Na became a tributary state of the First Toungoo Empire. He continued to reign under the auspices of Bayinnaung until 1564, when he was removed from office, in response to Mekuti's refusal to join Bayinnaung's military campaign against Ayutthaya, which was seen by Bayinnaung as an act of rebellion. Bayinnaung then appointed Wisutthithewi as queen regent of Lan Na.

Exile and death 
Upon Mekuti's removal from office, he was forced into exile and relocated to the Toungoo Empire's capital at Pegu (now Bago). During his stay at the Kanbawzathadi Palace, he was accorded with a royal residence crowned with a multi-tiered pyatthat roof. He died of dysentery in 1581.

Mekuti is worshipped as one of 37 nats (spirits) in the official pantheon in Burmese folk religion, and the only not to be of Burmese origins. Posthumous depictions of Mekuti as Yun Bayin nat portray a man dressed in Burmese royal attire, seated on a palin (throne), brandishing a sheathed sword.

See also
 List of rulers of Lan Na

References

22
Rulers of Chiang Mai
Toungoo dynasty
Deaths from dysentery
1581 deaths